The State University of New York at Fredonia (SUNY Fredonia) is a public university in Fredonia, New York, United States. It is the westernmost member of the State University of New York. Founded in 1826, it is the sixty-sixth-oldest institute of higher education in the United States, seventh-oldest college in New York, and second-oldest public school in New York (SUNY and CUNY) after SUNY Potsdam (1816).

Fredonia was one of the state teachers' colleges traditionally specializing in music education, but now offers programs in other areas, including a graduate division. Areas of study include science, communication, music, education, and the social sciences. There are over 80 majors and over 50 minors.

The Fredonia campus, located in Chautauqua County (southwest of Buffalo), was designed by prominent architects I. M. Pei and Henry N. Cobb in 1968.

History

Fredonia Academy (1826–1867)
Opened in 1826 as Fredonia Academy under its first principal Austin Smith, the academy enrolled eight students. The first classes began on October 4, 1826. Within one year the academy had 136 students, 81 boys and 55 girls. In 1827 it was a state normal school.

The academy reached peak enrollment in 1856 with 217 students. The school was plagued by financial shortages and was forced to close its doors in 1867.

Normal School (1867–1948)
In 1867, the college re-emerged for its second phase of existence, as a New York State Normal School. On December 2, 1867, the Normal (as it became commonly known) began classes with 147 students, 62 boys and 85 girls. For students preparing to be teachers, no tuition was charged, books were supplied, and travel costs were reimbursed; in return, students had to promise to teach after graduation. Those students not studying for the teaching profession paid tuition and provided their own textbooks.

During its 82 years, Fredonia Normal had a tumultuous existence. With a fluctuating student enrollment and threats of state funding reductions, the school seemed to be in constant jeopardy of closing. Nonetheless, gradually the school was upgraded. In 1930,  of land west of Central Avenue in the Village of Fredonia were bought to house a future campus. In 1938, music building (Mason Hall) was the first to be constructed on the Central Avenue site. New York State Governor Herbert Lehman signed the Feinberg Law in 1942 that changed the Normal Schools into Teacher Colleges, statewide.

State University System (1948–present)
With the formation of the State University of New York on March 13, 1948, the college created a Division of the Humanities in 1958, and in 1960 Fredonia was selected by State University to grant the A.B. degree. Previously, Fredonia's curriculum was restricted for teacher training only.

From the 1940s through the early 1960s, additional buildings were erected: Fenton Hall (administration), Jewett Hall (sciences), Dods Hall (physical education and athletics), an addition to Mason Hall, and residence halls Gregory, Alumni, McGinnies, Chautauqua, and Nixon.

In 1968, the master plan for the modern Central Avenue campus was drafted by the architectural firm of I. M. Pei & Partners of New York at the request of then-president Oscar E. Lanford. A complex came into being that consisted of the Rockefeller Arts Center (building for fine arts), Maytum Hall (administration), Daniel A. Reed Library, McEwen Hall, Campus Center student union (now Williams Center), Houghton Hall (sciences), and LoGrasso Medical Center (infirmary). Maytum Hall, McEwen Hall (lecture rooms), Reed Library, and the Williams Center were all inter-connected, including an elevated walkway connecting McEwen Hall and the Williams Center. Also included in the plan were the suite-style residence halls Kasling, Disney, Grissom, Eisenhower, and Erie Dining Hall (now closed); In 1970, Pei and Cobb returned to Fredonia to construct the second suite-style residence halls of Hemingway, Schulz, Igoe, and Hendrix.

In the early 1970s a second addition was made to Mason Hall (including practice rooms), science building Houghton Hall, and multi-discipline Thompson Hall. In 1981, construction was finally begun on the long-awaited major indoor sports facility, Steele Hall, which had been delayed for nearly nine years due to state funding difficulties throughout much of the 1970s. More recent campus buildings and additions have been the University Commons residence and dining hall, additions to Steele and Mason Halls, and another long-awaited project—the new science building adjoining Houghton Hall. A stadium for athletics—mainly soccer and lacrosse—which included an upgraded, lighted playing field, was recently built over the existing playing fields.

Between 1981 and 1999, the school was an official training camp site of Buffalo Bills.

Presidents

Note: Earlier Presidents were Principals of Fredonia Academy and are not included list.

Buildings

Architectures
Architects I. M. Pei and Henry N. Cobb designed the master plan for the modernized campus in 1968. Many of the buildings are listed in architectural guides as examples of exceptional modern architecture. Some are described in architectural history books. The National Building Museum listed the SUNY Fredonia campus as one of I. M. Pei's ideal places to visit in its 1991 journal Blueprints.

Pei is credited with designing Maytum Hall, Williams Center, Reed Library, Rockefeller Arts Center, and McEwen Hall, as well as its characteristic circular perimeter road, aptly named Ring Road. The design of Daniel Reed Library earned Henry Cobb and I. M. Pei the 1969 Prestressed Concrete Institute Award.

Academic and administrative buildings
Reed Library was constructed in 1969. It is approximately the size of a regulation football field, provides seating for over 850 readers, and houses over 250,000 books. It is named for Daniel A. Reed (1875–1959), U.S. Representative from the Fredonia area for over 40 years. A four-story addition to Reed Library, known as the Carnahan-Jackson Center, was constructed in 1992; it includes several study areas, a scholarship center, atrium, elevators, tower study lounge which leads to a fifth story, the Tutoring Center, and the Special Collections & Archives Division of Reed Library.
Michael C. Rockefeller Arts Center, constructed in 1968, is named after the youngest son of former Governor Nelson A. Rockefeller, who disappeared in 1961 during an anthropological expedition in New Guinea. Designed by I. M. Pei and Partners, Rockefeller Arts Center includes King Concert Hall (a 1,200-seat concert hall), Marvel Theatre (a 400-seat proscenium theatre), Alice E. Bartlett Theatre (a 200-seat maximum black box theatre), an art gallery, and 24 classrooms. This building houses the Department of Theatre and Dance, and the Department of Visual Arts and New Media. The arts center was opened in 1968 by Clint Norton as its first managing director. He was followed by Robert B. D'Angelo who served from 1970 to 1974 while he also served as a speech writer and adviser to then Governor Nelson A. Rockefeller. Following D'Angelo in the directorship were Ted Dede, Nancy Palmer, Katherine Rushworth and Radford Thomas. Jefferson Westwood has served as director since 1982.
Fenton Hall was named for Reuben Fenton (1819–1885), U.S. Senator, and Governor, who was born in Carroll, Chautauqua County. Fenton Hall houses the office of the University President, the Graduate Studies office, as well as classrooms, academic departments and Sprout Café. Computer Science, Modern Languages, English, and Philosophy are some of the departments located in Fenton.
Mason Hall is home to the School of Music and was named after American music education pioneer Lowell Mason. This hall is actually three buildings, "Old Mason" (the oldest building on the present-day campus site), "New Mason," and the recent addition of two rehearsal rooms, which are all connected together. Mason Hall includes over 100 personal practice rooms, several small ensemble practice rooms, and large ensemble rooms. Both Juliet J. Rosch Recital Hall and Diers Recital Hall are located here, as well as two MIDI technology labs, and a Studio Recording Department.
Maytum Hall is an eight-story, semi-circular office building and computer center, and was named after Arthur Maytum (1866–1953). He served as chairman of the Board of Visitors of the Fredonia Normal School and Teachers college from 1928 to 1953. He also served as supervisor of the Town of Pomfret from 1931 to 1938. 
Steele Hall is mainly used as a sports center with a basketball court, indoor track, and an ice rink which are used for both campus and community events. It also contains classrooms, a newly constructed natatorium, racquetball courts, dancing practice rooms, and many other facilities.
Thompson Hall is the largest academic building at SUNY Fredonia. It houses the departments of Multicultural Affairs, Psychology, Political Science, Speech Pathology, Sociology, Business Administration, History, plus the College of Education. The building, planned during the period of nationwide campus upheavals in the late 1960s and early 1970s, was designed to be riot-proof, with its narrow stairwells, dimly lighted hallways, and no operable windows.
Houghton Hall, Jewett Hall, and the Science Center are the three science buildings at SUNY Fredonia. They house the departments of Geology, Physics, Chemistry, Biology, and Biochemistry, and the 3-2 Cooperative Engineering Program. The Science Center features an observatory, a greenhouse, and an herbarium.
LoGrasso Hall On campus medical services, along with counseling, and the office of international education.
McEwen Hall Four-level building, Contains lecture halls, Sheldon Media Labs, and Fredonia Radio Systems (WCVF-FM).
The College Lodge, located in Brocton, NY and operated by the Faculty Student Association at SUNY Fredonia, is a nature reserve and a certified experiential training facility and conference and events center that offers workforce development, employee training, meetings and other services for businesses and organizations. 
The Technology Incubator, located in Dunkirk, NY, is a facility that encourages and instructs the development of small businesses and entrepreneurship skills.

Residence halls
SUNY Fredonia has 15 residence halls. Students have a choice of building style: corridor, suite, kitchen suite, or independent living. Corridor-style residence halls are long, staggered hallways with no sections, whereas suites are short corridors with either staggered hallways extending from the main corridor or doors leading into the individual suites.

Academic

Rankings
U.S. News & World Reports 2016 edition of America's Best Colleges ranked Fredonia 66th on their list of Regional Universities (North). Fredonia's graduate program in Speech-Language Pathology is ranked 163rd.

Colleges and Schools
The university is organized into 3 colleges and 2 schools:

College of Visual and Performing Arts
College of Liberal Arts and Sciences
College of Education
School of Business
School of Music

Student life

On campus student media
WCVF-FM is a public FM radio station located in McEwen Hall, broadcasting from the top of Maytum Hall on campus. Licensed to the State University of New York at Fredonia, the station broadcasts on 88.9 MHz on the FM dial. "CVF" stands for "Campus and Community Voice of Fredonia," the station's slogan. The station primarily features "alternative" rock, but includes an eclectic mix of genres at consistent times throughout the week. Listeners can catch blocks of Polka, Spanish, Blues, Jazz, Folk, Reggae, Hip Hop and anything in between. Live programs hosted by student and community jocks can be of any format/genre from talk, music, to radio drama. WCVF also covers local sports and includes live broadcasts/commentary for several Blue Devil teams. WCVF broadcasts National Public Radio (NPR) Monday through Friday: Morning Edition (7–9 am) and All Things Considered (4–6 pm). These broadcasts are achieved through a partnership with NPR member station WQLN-FM in Erie, Pennsylvania. WCVF-FM has a sister station WDVL which broadcasts via internet streaming and a local cable channel.

The Normal Leader was created in May 1892 by the Agonian Society, an all-male literary organization, and later the Zetesian Society, an all-female organization. The first issues were entirely handwritten, and printed issues began with a renumbered Volume 1, Issue 1 in February 1893. The Normal Leader was a monthly newspaper, costing ten cents a copy or fifty cents for a yearly subscription. On September 28, 1936 The Normal Leader became The Leader on its Vol. XXXVI article No. 3 even though the school would not change its name to SUNY Fredonia until 1948. The Leader is produced by a team of Fredonia students, some of whom receive stipends from the Student Association. The Leader is printed by the Corry Journal in Corry, Pennsylvania and is distributed free on campus and in the surrounding community. Today, The Leader features mainly news which is pertinent to the SUNY Fredonia campus and community. This weekly publication comes out every Wednesday during the academic year and can be found around the SUNY Fredonia Campus.

WNYF is the Student television station of the university. WNYF is sponsored by the Student Association, and was founded in 1979 by two communications students. WNYF's programming includes student-produced programs ranging from entertainment, music, educational television and even a student-written soap opera. In the station's first few months of existence, it began televising the annual dance marathon that raised funds for muscular dystrophy. WNYF maintains an archive of every show produced by the students since 1979. The station was relocated several times, and WNYF settled into its current location in Hendrix Hall in 1997. WNYF broadcasts to the campus on cable TV Channel 8, and to the Public-access television on Channels 17 in Fredonia and 19 in Dunkirk.

Athletics

SUNY Fredonia teams participate as a member of the National Collegiate Athletic Association's Division III. The Blue Devils are a member of the State University of New York Athletic Conference (SUNYAC). Men's sports include baseball, basketball, cross country, ice hockey, soccer, swimming & diving and track & field; while women's sports include basketball, cheerleading, cross country, lacrosse, soccer, softball, swimming & diving, tennis, track & field and volleyball.

When SUNY Fredonia was first known as the Fredonia Normal School, the athletics teams were known as the "Normalites". On January 27, 1936, The Leader issued an article which publicized a contest to come up with a new name for the teams. There were two names the committee had chosen, Blue Jackets and Blue Devils. The name Blue Devils seemed to be used more than Blue Jackets. In the issue of The Leader on September 30, 1952; the name Blue Devils was used officially for the first time.

Notable alumni

Business
Dr. Benjamin Franklin Goodrich, 1857 – founder of B.F. Goodrich tire company
Karl Holz, 1973 – president of Disney Cruise Lines
James H. McGraw, 1884 – founder of McGraw-Hill Companies

Entertainment
Nick Bernardone, 2008 – writer/producer, five-time Emmy multiple WGA Award winner/nominee and PGA Award winner
Rich Ceisler, 1978 – stand-up comedian, actor, writer 
Jennifer Cody, 1991 – actress
 Pete Correale, 1992 – stand-up comedian
Brian Frons, 1977 – president, daytime, Disney-ABC Television Group
Peter Michael Goetz, 1965 – actor
Mary McDonnell, 1974 – Academy Award-nominated actress
Tom Pokel, 1991 – Head coach, Italy national ice hockey team
Andrea Romano, 1977 – casting and voice director; Peabody Award winner, Emmy Award winner
Kevin Sylvester, 1995 – co-owner of the Buffalo Sports Page

Music
Lance Bernard Bryant, 2002 – vocalist, current member of The Platters
Greg Collins, Grammy Award-winning recording engineer/producer
Dave Fridmann – Grammy Award-winning recording engineer/producer
Marcus Goldhaber, 2000 – (BFA in Musical Theatre) – NYC-based jazz vocalist, bandleader
Roberta Guaspari, 1969 – music educator
Onaje Allan Gumbs, 1971 – pianist, composer, and bandleader
James Houlik, 1964 – American tenor saxophonist
Don Menza – saxophonist, arranger, composer, jazz educator
Kevin Moore – original keyboardist for Dream Theater
Bob McChesney – studio and jazz trombonist
Chris Poland, 1981 – Guitar player for heavy metal band Megadeth
Stephen Roessner, 2004 – Grammy Award-winning recording engineer/producer
Gar Samuelson, 1982 – Drummer for heavy metal band Megadeth

Politics, Government and Law
Marcus M. Drake, 1852 – Mayor of Buffalo, 1882
Paul Cambria, 1969 – First Amendment lawyer

 William Conrad III, 2000- member of the New York State Assembly

Reuben Fenton – U.S. Senator and Governor of New York State from 1865 to 1868 (Attended part of a term at Fredonia Academy)
James Brendan Foley, 1979 – Diplomat, served as the U.S. Ambassador to the Republic of Haiti, and as the U.S. Ambassador to the Republic of Croatia
Ozra Amander Hadley – Governor of the State of Arkansas from 1871 to 1873
Robert Spitzer, 1975 – political scientist
Frank Manly Thorn, lawyer, politician, government official, essayist, journalist, humorist, and inventor, sixth Superintendent of the United States Coast and Geodetic Survey (1885–1889)

Literature and Education

Lucille Clifton, 1955 – American poet
Gaelen Foley, 1991 – author
Greta Morine-Dershimer – American education researcher
Neil Postman, 1953 – educator and author
Wendy Corsi Staub, 1986 – author
Jean Webster, 1894 – Novelist. Graduated from Fredonia Normal School

Science
Jeffery W. Kelly, 1982 – B.S. Chemistry
Michael Marletta, 1973 – chemist and MacArthur Fellow

References

External links

 
1826 establishments in New York (state)
Education in Buffalo, New York
Education in Chautauqua County, New York
Fredonia
State University of New York at Fredonia
Liberal arts colleges in New York (state)
Educational institutions established in 1826
I. M. Pei buildings